Since the premiere of the children's television program Sesame Street on November 10, 1969, it has included what writer Malcolm Gladwell has called "the essence of Sesame Street—the artful blend of fluffy monsters and earnest adults". The original cast, chosen by original producer Jon Stone, consisted of four human actors—Matt Robinson, who played Gordon; Loretta Long, who played Gordon's wife, Susan; Will Lee, who played Mr. Hooper; and Bob McGrath, who played Bob. Unlike most children's television programs at the time, the producers of Sesame Street decided against using a single host and cast a group of ethnically diverse, primarily African American actors/presenters, with, as Sesame Street researcher Gerald S. Lesser put it, "a variety of distinctive and reliable personalities".

Stone did not audition actors until spring 1969, a few weeks before five shows, designed to test the show's appeal to children and to examine their comprehension of the material, were due to be filmed. Stone videotaped the auditions, and researcher Ed Palmer took them out into the field to test children's reactions. The actors who received the "most enthusiastic thumbs up" were cast. For example, when the children saw Long's audition, they stood up and sang along with her rendition of "I'm a Little Teapot". As Stone said, casting was the only aspect of the show that was "just completely haphazard". Most of the cast and crew found jobs on Sesame Street through personal relationships with Stone and the other producers.

The results of the test shows, which were never intended for broadcast and shown to preschoolers in 60 homes throughout Philadelphia and in day care centers in New York City in July 1969, were "generally very positive". The researchers found that children learned from the shows, that the show's appeal was high, and that children's attention was sustained over the full hour. However, they found that, although children's attention was high during the Muppet segments, their interest wavered when there were only humans on screen. The producers had followed the advice of child psychologists who were concerned that children would be confused, and had recommended that human actors and Muppets not be shown together. As a result of this decision, the appeal of the test episodes was lower than they would have liked, so the show's producers knew they needed to make significant changes, including defying the recommendations of their advisers and show the human and Muppet characters together. Lesser called this decision "a turning point in the history of Sesame Street".  Muppet creator Jim Henson and his coworkers created Muppets for Sesame Street that could interact with the human actors, and many segments were re-shot.

The human cast currently consists of Alan, Chris, Nina and the newest resident, Charlie. Though no longer part of the show, longtime cast members Bob, Gordon, Susan, Luis, Maria and Gina have still made special appearances on occasion, in online videos, TV specials and at live appearances. In 2019, retired characters from the series such as Linda, Miles and Leela returned for the TV special Sesame Street's 50th Anniversary Celebration.

Characters

Children
Debo Adegbile
Christopher Aguilar
Tatyana Ali
Jennifer Altman
Marlena Attinasi
Lynsey Bartilson
Matthew Bartilson
Adam Beech
Audrey Bennett
Maya Bernstein
Asa Karsten Bernstine
Lexine Bondoc
Joseph Brancale
Jesse Branson
Christian Buenaventura
Emma Faith Bullard
Michael Bundy
Brittany Burton
Tiffany Burton
Troy Byer
Joey Calvan
Layla Capers
Percy Carey
Gus Carr
Bryan Holden Chan
Debbie Chen
Brynne Clarke
Jules Cohen
Tanya Cook
Carla Davis
Rosario Dawson
Morgan DeSena
Cate Elefante
Edith Feinstein
Mara Feinstein
Tessa Frascogna
Kari Floberg
Enjoli Flynn
Isaiah Givens
Todd Graff
Stephen Gustafson
Maggie Gyllenhaal
Kenya Harris
Zelda Harris
Paul Hernandez
Kathleen Herles
Aldis Hodge
Edwin Hodge
Galen Hooks
Starmya Howard
Lauren Jackson
Skai Jackson
Leah Janvier
Mika Kakizaki
Kamran Kamjou
Daniel Kean
Danielle Keaton
Mathew Kelly
Brady Kimball
Jason Kingsley
Cory Kotas
Emily Ladau
Jacob Laval
Jasmina Lee
Kaian Lilien
Devon Liu
Lindsay Lohan
Shola Lynch
Devon Mack
Rasjahwara Malcolm
Suri Marrero
Andrew Mackasek
Michael Minden
Michelle Montoya
Corey Moss
Todd Moss
Brandon Nai
Megan Ng
Hassan Nicholas
Briahnna Odom
Antonio Ortiz
Colton Osorio
Luca Padovan
Evan Paley
Mimi Paley
Diana Papas
Isaac Patinkin
Holly Robinson Peete
Sara Perks
Alexandra Picatto
Katie Polk
Isabella Preston
Fátima Ptacek
Keshia Knight Pulliam
Jonathan Raskin
Kim Raver
Kerri E. Regan
Kathleen Reilly
Nichole Rifkin
Samantha Rivera
Miles Robbins
Matt Robinson Jr
Wesley Rodgerson
Sharon Roffman
Rebekka Santana
Raphael Sbarge
Matthew Schwartz
Josh Selig
Madisyn Shipman
Jason Samuel Smith
Jodi Stahl
Polly Stone
Alice Tai
Amy Tai
Vernon M. Thomas
Ashley Tisdale
Jay Tucker
Jenna Ushkowitz
Jessica Vaughn
Hunter Vogel
Christopher Wein
John Williams III
Lonnell Williams
Tyler James Williams
Tyrel Jackson Williams
Alexandra Young
Nathan Zoob
Others

See also
 List of Sesame Street Muppets
 List of animated Sesame Street characters

Citations

General and cited references
 Borgenicht, David (1998). Sesame Street Unpaved. New York: Hyperion Publishing. 
 Davis, Michael (2008). Street Gang: The Complete History of Sesame Street. New York: Viking Penguin. 
 Gikow, Louise A. (2009). Sesame Street: A Celebration—Forty Years of Life on the Street. New York: Black Dog & Leventhal Publishers. .
 Gladwell, Malcolm (2000).  The Tipping Point: How Little Things Can Make a Big Difference.  New York: Little, Brown, and Company.  
 Lesser, Gerald S. (1974).  Children and Television: Lessons From Sesame Street.  New York: Vintage Books. 

 
Sesame Street, human
Sesame Street, human